Semantic Error is a 2022 South Korean streaming television series based on a homonymous BL web novel by Jeo Soo-ri, starring Park Seo-ham and Park Jae-chan. It premiered on February 16, 2022, on Watcha. The series was included on Teen Vogue's best BL dramas of 2022 list.

The theatrical version of the series, Semantic Error: The Movie, was first screened at the 26th Bucheon International Fantastic Film Festival and commercially released in August 2022.

Synopsis

Computer science major Chu Sang-woo (Park Jae-chan) is the embodiment of an inflexible and strict rule-abiding person. While working on a liberal arts group project with freeloaders who don't put in any effort, Sang-woo decides to remove their names from the final presentation. But he didn't imagine how involved he would become with the person whose plans to study abroad were messed up because of that project. The involved person, the popular campus star who everyone knows, Department of Design's Jang Jae-young (Park Seo-ham). He has everything from skills, looks, family background and good relationships, except for one big problem, Chu Sang-woo. What happens when an engineer and an artist whose personalities are like oil and water, have to work together? Jae-young is like a semantic error in the perfect world of Sang-woo. Will Sang-woo be able to debug this?

Cast

Main
 Park Seo-ham as Jang Jae-young
 Park Jae-chan as Chu Sang-woo

Supporting
 Kim Noh-jin as Ryu Ji-hye
 Cha Jae-hoon as Lee Dong-gun
 Song Ji-oh as Choi Yu-na
 Kim Won-ki as Go Hyeong-taek
 Jung Joon-gyo as Ted Hyung

Guest
 Lee Kyoung-yoon as waiter (Episode 5)
 Kim Jong-hyeong as a customer (Episode 5)
 Kim Se-hyeon as a customer (Episode 5)
 Jeon Min-gyu as a customer (Episode 5)
 Ryu Gi-seok as a customer (Episode 5)

Awards and nominations

Notes

References

External links
 
 
 

South Korean LGBT-related television shows
Viki (streaming service) original programming
South Korean boys' love television series
2022 South Korean television series debuts
South Korean drama web series
Television series by RaemongRaein